allNovaScotia is an online newspaper based in Halifax, Nova Scotia, Canada.

Founded in March 2001 by David Bentley and his daughter Caroline Wood, the subscription news service focuses on business and political news throughout the province.

All articles are protected by a hard paywall, which prevents non-subscribers from viewing any content.

As of 2013, the newspaper claimed to have over 7,000 subscribers and employed 15 paid journalists.

The company launched its sister-publication allNewfoundlandLabrador in St. John's, Newfoundland and Labrador in 2016.

See also
 Halifax Examiner
 Local Xpress
 Media in Halifax, Nova Scotia

References

External links
 

2001 establishments in Nova Scotia
Canadian news websites
Newspapers published in Halifax, Nova Scotia
Publications established in 2001